Jaya Teguh Angga Warsito is an Indonesian footballer who currently plays for PSBI Blitar in the Liga 2. His natural position is striker.

External links
 

1987 births
Living people
Sportspeople from Malang
Indonesian footballers
Liga 1 (Indonesia) players
Indonesian Premier Division players
Persema Malang players
Arema F.C. players
Association football forwards